The Spirit River is a tributary of the Wisconsin River with headwaters in Price County and a confluence with the Wisconsin in Lincoln County just downstream from Lake Mohawksin.  The source is Spirit Lake near Timms Hill.  The Ojibwe name for the river was Manatokikewe Sebe (Stooping Spirit River).
  The river flows nearly west to east.  About one mile from its mouth, the Wisconsin Valley Improvement Company maintains a dam which forms the Spirit River Flowage.

See also

List of rivers in Wisconsin

Notes

External links

Rivers of Lincoln County, Wisconsin
Rivers of Price County, Wisconsin
Rivers of Wisconsin